Wooden Blue Records was a Phoenix, AZ independent record label in the late 1980s to early 1990s perhaps best known for releasing Jimmy Eat World's first LP in 1994.
It specialized in Punk Rock, Indie Rock and Emo.
It was run by Joel Leibow and Jeremy Yocum.

Roster 
 Andherson
 Aquanaut Drinks Coffee
 Carrier
 Christie Front Drive
 Haskel
 Jimmy Eat World
 Pine Wyatt
 Safehouse
 Temper Tantrum

See also
 List of record labels

External links
 Wooden Blue on Myspace music

 
American independent record labels